Events from the year 1874 in France.

Incumbents
President: Patrice de MacMahon, Duke of Magenta 
President of the Council of Ministers: Albert, duc de Broglie (until 22 May), Ernest Courtot de Cissey (starting 22 May)

Events
 15 March – France and the Nguyễn dynasty of Vietnam sign the Second Treaty of Saigon, further recognizing the full sovereignty of France over Cochinchina.

Arts and literature
 23 January – Camille Saint-Saëns' composition Danse Macabre is premiered.
 25 April – Louis Leroy reviews the first Impressionist exhibition, held in Paris, and  coins the term with reference to Claude Monet's Impression, Sunrise.

Births

January to June
 21 January – René-Louis Baire, mathematician (died 1932)
 19 February – Rose Gelbert, golfer (died 1956)
 22 March – Jean Cau, rower.
 3 May – François Coty, perfume manufacturer (died 1934)
 14 May – Polaire (Emilie Marie Bouchaud), singer and actress (died 1939)

July to December
 29 July – Auguste Giroux, rugby union player (died 1953)
 4 September – Jean d'Orléans, duc de Guise, great-grandson of Louis Philippe I, King of the French (died 1940)
 4 October – Joseph d'Arbaud, poet (died 1950)
 25 October – Henri Bénard, physicist (died 1939)
 2 November – Georges Andrique, painter (died 1964)
 14 November – André-Gaston Prételat, general (died 1969)
 5 December – Henriette Caillaux, socialite and assassin (died 1943)
 6 December – Lucien Démanet, gymnast
 24 December – Yves Le Febvre, writer and politician (died 1959)

References

1870s in France